1941 The Wrekin by-election was held on 26 September 1941.  The by-election was held due to the death of the incumbent Conservative MP, James Baldwin-Webb.  It was won by the Conservative candidate Arthur Colegate.

References

1941 elections in the United Kingdom
1941 in England
20th century in Shropshire
Telford and Wrekin
By-elections to the Parliament of the United Kingdom in Shropshire constituencies